Emmanuel Stockbroekx (born 23 December 1993) is a Belgian field hockey player who plays for Orée and the Belgian national team as a defender.

Club career
Stockbroekx played in Belgium for Dragons until 2016, when he moved to the Netherlands to play for Bloemendaal. In April 2019, he announced he would return to Dragons after a three year stint at Bloemendaal. In his final season with Bloemendaal, he won the Dutch national title by defeating Kampong in the championship final. In June 2020, it was announced he joined Royal Orée for the 2020–21 season.

International career
With Belgium, Stockbroekx became European vice-champion at the 2013 European Championship on home ground in Boom. Three years later, he appeared at the 2016 Summer Olympics field hockey tournament. During the Olympic tournament's group phase, he scored a goal against Spain. In November 2018, he was selected for the Belgium squad for the 2018 World Cup. After the second match, he had to withdraw because of a hamstring injury. In August 2019, he was selected in the Belgium squad for the 2019 EuroHockey Championship. They won Belgium its first European title by defeating Spain 5-0 in the final.

References

External links

1993 births
Living people
Belgian male field hockey players
Male field hockey defenders
2014 Men's Hockey World Cup players
Field hockey players at the 2016 Summer Olympics
2018 Men's Hockey World Cup players
Olympic field hockey players of Belgium
Olympic silver medalists for Belgium
Olympic medalists in field hockey
Medalists at the 2016 Summer Olympics
HC Bloemendaal players
KHC Dragons players
Men's Hoofdklasse Hockey players
Expatriate field hockey players
Belgian expatriate sportspeople in the Netherlands
Place of birth missing (living people)
Men's Belgian Hockey League players